Countess Marie Anatole Louise Élisabeth Greffulhe (née de Riquet de Caraman-Chimay; 11 July 1860 – 21 August 1952) was a French socialite, known as a renowned beauty and queen of the salons of the Faubourg Saint-Germain in Paris.

Life 

She was born in Paris, the daughter of Joseph de Riquet de Caraman, 18th Prince de Chimay (1836–1892) and his wife, Marie de Montesquiou-Fézensac (1834–1884). Through her father, she was a granddaughter of Teresa Cabarrús, one of the leaders of Parisian social life during the Directory, and a great-granddaughter of memoirist Émilie Pellapra, who claimed to be a daughter of Napoleon.

The countess entertained an unrequited love for her cousin, the exquisite aesthete Count Robert de Montesquiou, in concert with whom she was in contact with the cream of Parisian society, whom she regularly entertained at her salon in the rue d'Astorg. He would describe her eyes as "black fireflies". The colour of her eyes was unusual; as Mina Curtiss, who visited her, noticed, her eyes were like "the dark purple brown-tinged petals of a rarely seen pansy."

She married Henri, Count Greffulhe (1848–1932), of the Belgian family of bankers, on 28 September 1881. He was an unfaithful, quick-tempered man. They had one daughter, Élaine (1882–1958), who married Armand, 12th Duke of Gramont, half-brother of the openly bisexual writer the Duchess of Clermont-Tonnerre, who wrote about Élisabeth: "The Comtesse Greffulhe is always beautiful and always elsewhere. But it would be a mistake to think that her life was merely the pursuit of pleasure (...) not only is she beautiful, but she is a lady. Preferring the privacy of her own house in the rue d'Astorg and at Bois-Boudran in the country, the Comtesse Greffulhe never dined out except at the British Embassy. When Edward VII came to Paris, he dined informally at her house. After a restricted youth (...) she set herself to attracting musicians, scholars, physicists, chemists, doctors."

The countess helped establish the art of James Whistler, and she actively promoted such artists as Auguste Rodin, Antonio de La Gandara and Gustave Moreau. Gabriel Fauré dedicated to her his Pavane, which received its first full performance, with the optional chorus, at a garden party she held in the Bois de Boulogne. She was a patron of Sergei Diaghilev's Ballets Russes, and launched a fashion for greyhound racing. Fascinated by science, she helped Marie Curie to finance the creation of the Institute of Radium, and Édouard Branly to pursue his research on radio transmission and telemechanical systems.

She is one of the main inspirations for the character of the duchesse de Guermantes in Marcel Proust's À la recherche du temps perdu. Her husband, Count Greffulhe, is the main and almost unique inspiration for the character of the duc de Guermantes. A recent biography demonstrates – relying in particular on research into the author's draft notebooks – that Countess Greffulhe and her family, who inspired several of the characters in À la recherche du temps perdu, played a major role in the genesis of the work and in the discovery of the "magic" name of Guermantes.

She died in Lausanne, Switzerland, on 21 August 1952.

Gallery

Notes

References
Newton, Joy, 'Whistler's French Connections: Count Robert de Montesquiou and Countess Greffulhe,' Laurels, vol. 53, no. 1
Michel-Thiriet, Philippe, The Book of Proust, London, 1989
Munhall, Edgar, Whistler and Montesquiou. The Butterfly and the Bat, New York, 1995
Painter, George, Marcel Proust, Chatto & Windus, London, 1959.
Hillerin, Laure, La comtesse Greffulhe, l'Ombre des Guermantes, Paris, Flammarion, 2014

External links
 

1860 births
1952 deaths
Elisabeth
French socialites
French salon-holders